Canadian Football League attendance has averaged no fewer than 20,000 spectators per game for every season since 1963. The CFL consistently draws, on average, the third or fourth largest crowds to its games of any professional sports league in North America, ranking behind the National Football League and Major League Baseball, about on par with Liga MX and ahead of Major League Soccer, the National Basketball Association, National Hockey League and the National Lacrosse League.

To date, a CFL game has drawn in excess of 50,000 spectators 111 times.  It happened for the first six times in 1976, when Toronto's Exhibition Stadium was renovated to accommodate the Toronto Blue Jays, and its capacity was enlarged to become the first CFL stadium capable of holding such a large crowd. Later that same season, the Montreal Alouettes moved into Olympic Stadium, following the 1976 Summer Olympics. Large stadiums were constructed soon afterward for the Edmonton Eskimos and BC Lions. During the late 1970s and early 1980s, CFL attendance peaked at about 30,000 fans per game.

During the 1980s and 1990s, CFL attendance declined sharply, reaching its nadir by the mid 1990s due in large part to the league's unsuccessful attempt to expand to the United States. Since start of the 21st century, CFL attendance has stabilized. During the current decade, new stadiums have been constructed for the Hamilton Tiger-Cats, Ottawa Redblacks and Winnipeg Blue Bombers, all with modern amenities and capacities of between one quarter and one half the capacity of an average NFL stadium. A new stadium is under construction to house the Saskatchewan Roughriders while BMO Field in Toronto, originally built for Toronto FC of Major League Soccer, is being renovated to accommodate the Toronto Argonauts. Existing stadiums, most notably Commonwealth Stadium in Edmonton and BC Place in Vancouver, have undergone major upgrades.

During the 2010s, CFL attendance has consistently exceeded 25,000 fans per game. An average of 25,286 fans watched CFL games in 2014. CFL attendance has been depressed during the middle of the current decade by short-term issues, most notably the lack of stadium availability in Toronto and Hamilton. By 2018, attendances in Toronto, Montreal, and Vancouver were consistently below 20,000 fans, prompting long-term concerns in those markets.

Top single-game attendance marks 

Below is a list of all Canadian Football League games reported to have been attended by 60,000 or more spectators.

League Records

Single Game Records

Season Records

Team Records

BC Lions

Calgary Stampeders

Edmonton Elks

Hamilton Tiger-Cats

Ottawa Rough Riders / Renegades / Redblacks

Montreal Alouettes

Saskatchewan Roughriders

Toronto Argonauts

Winnipeg Blue Bombers

CFL attendance vs. other North American professional sports leagues
The following table compares the Canadian Football League regular season average attendance against the regular-season average attendance for the other professional sports leagues in North America with average attendance of at least 10,000 spectators per game.

References 

 
Attendance
Sports attendance